Embankment Films is an international film and television sales and production company based in London, England.

History 

Founded in 2012 by Tim Haslam and Hugo Grumbar, Embankment procures pre-sales, tax-credit facilities, equity, gap financing and worldwide distribution for feature films and television.

Haslam was formerly CEO at Hanway Films, and has overseen sales of more than 150 films, including Steve McQueen's Shame starring Michael Fassbender, Becoming Jane starring Anne Hathaway and James McAvoy, Resident Evil starring Milla Jovovich, seven films directed by Woody Allen, and Academy Award winners The Piano, Dances With Wolves and Iris.

Grumbar was formerly joint MD of the UK division of Icon Film Distribution. Grumbar was responsible for the acquisition and distribution of films such as Paranormal Activity, Apocalypto, The Passion Of The Christ, La Vie En Rose, Mr. Magorium's Wonder Emporium, Buried, Man on Wire, A Single Man, Drive, and Precious.

Since the creation of the company, Embankment has raised finance for over 30 feature films including The Dressmaker starring Kate Winslet and Liam Hemsworth, Boychoir starring Dustin Hoffman, Le Week-End, starring Jim Broadbent and Lindsay Duncan, Churchill, starring Brian Cox, Miranda Richardson and John Slattery, Breathe, directed by Andy Serkis, starring Andrew Garfield and Claire Foy, Driven starring Jason Sudeikis, Lee Pace and Corey Stoll, Red Joan, directed by Trevor Nunn, starring Judi Dench and Sophie Cookson, Ride Like a Girl, directed by Rachel Griffiths, starring Teresa Palmer and Sam Neill, Untouchable directed by Ursula Macfarlane and produced by Simon Chinn, Can You Keep a Secret? starring Alexandra Daddario and Tyler Hoechlin, Summerland, directed by Jessica Swale, starring Gemma Arterton and Gugu Mbatha-Raw, Military Wives, directed by Peter Cattaneo, starring Kristen Scott Thomas and Sharon Horgan, and The Father, directed by Florian Zeller, starring Anthony Hopkins and Olivia Colman. The Father    has received six Academy Award nominations, including Best Picture, Best Actor, Best Supporting Actress, Best Adapted Screenplay, Best Production Design and Best Film Editing, and has won two British Academy Film Awards, Best Leading Actor and Best Adapted Screenplay.

Film library 

 
 
 Churchill (2017)
 [ My Name is Lenny (2017)]
 Submergence (2017)
 Hush (2017)
 Please Stand By (2017)
 Breath (2017)
 The Wife (2017)
 Breathe (2017)
 McQueen (2017)
 Galveston (2018)
 Driven (2018)
 Summerland (2018)
 Red Joan (2018) 
 Ride Like a Girl (2018)
Untouchable (2019)
Can You Keep a Secret? (2019)
Military Wives (2019)
The Father (2019)

References

External links
 Official website

Film production companies of the United Kingdom
Companies established in 2012
International sales agents